The North American Racing Team (NART) is a motorsport racing team founded in 1958. It was created by businessman Luigi Chinetti to promote the Ferrari marque in North America through success in endurance racing.

It was created in 1958 when Chinetti received backing from wealthy racers George Arents and Jan de Vroom. Ferrari already had a close relationship with Chinetti due to his success in selling the maker's road cars in the important American markets, and thus NART received a continuous line of Ferrari racers and support from factory mechanics.

In racing 
NART raced at only the world's premier races, such as the 24 Hours of Daytona in Florida and the 24 Hours of Le Mans in Le Mans, France.  Their first race was the 12 Hours of Sebring in March 1958, with a 250 GT.

Pedro Rodríguez won the second and the third editions of Daytona with NART team. In 1963 was a three hours race and in 1964 a 2,000 kilometers, both in a Ferrari 250 GTO (the 24 hours race would start until 1966).

A Ferrari 158 car officially entered by NART sealed the win of the 1964 F1 World championship with John Surtees, as the works team competed the last two races (the United States Grand Prix and Mexican Grand Prix) in cars painted white with blue lengthwise "Cunningham racing stripes" - the national colours of the teams licensed in the United States. This was done as a protest concerning arguments between Ferrari and the Italian motorsport body ACI regarding the homologation of a new mid-engined Ferrari race car.

The peak of NART's own racing success came in 1965, when a NART-entered 250 LM became the last Ferrari to win Le Mans outright, driven by Jochen Rindt, Masten Gregory and Ed Hugus.

Other NART results include a third place in the 1967 24 Hours of Daytona with Pedro Rodríguez and Jean Guichet, backing up two works 330 P4 in Ferrari's triple success, which was commemorated by the naming of the 365 GTB4 "Daytona". With this model, NART scored second in the 1973 24 Hours of Daytona behind a Porsche 911.

NART raced Ferraris until 1982, at which point it had participated in more than 200 races with over 100 different drivers, including Mario Andretti and Phil Hill.

Road cars 

NART also had a Ferrari model with its name attached to it – the 1967 275 GTB/4S NART Spyder was a convertible version of the 275 GTB/4 requested especially by Luigi Chinetti. The original order of 25 cars was never fulfilled, as only 10 were delivered from the Maranello factory. Because of the popularity of the drop-top NART Spyder design, many 275 GTB/4 were converted to drop-top models to imitate the NART Spyder's design.

Results

Victories in the World Sportscar Championship

Formula One World Championship results
(key) (Results in bold indicate pole position; results in italics indicate fastest lap; † indicates shared drive.)

References 

Ferrari
American auto racing teams
Formula One entrants
24 Hours of Le Mans teams
World Sportscar Championship teams
Can-Am entrants
Ferrari in motorsport
Italy–United States relations